The Northrop Grumman X-47C is a design for a stealth, unmanned aircraft. Its ancestors the X-47A and the X-47B made this unmanned aircraft possible to carry out the "stealth" that was needed in order to be difficult to detect by radar. The initial date for building the aircraft was in 2018, although changes will most likely be made as in whether to continue with the design or to use a more advanced system.

References

X-47C
Proposed aircraft of the United States
Blended wing body
Tailless aircraft
Unmanned military aircraft of the United States
Unmanned stealth aircraft